Lakota East High School is a four-year, public high school in Liberty Township, a suburb of Cincinnati, Ohio, United States. It is a member of the Lakota Local School District, which comprises both West Chester Township and Liberty Township. The district was originally unified under one high school, Lakota High School, until 1997 when the district expanded and formed two new high schools – Lakota East and Lakota West. The high school enrolls over 2,500 students in grades 9–12, repurposing the former high school as a freshman building named Lakota West Freshman School.

History
Along with Lakota West High School, Lakota East was part of a unified Lakota High School. The two physically identical schools were built in 1997 when severe over-crowding forced the district to expand. In 2009, the old Lakota Freshman School was split, and a brand new building was made for Lakota East freshman. The old Lakota Freshman School is now current the Lakota West Freshman School. The two high schools have an inter-district rivalry in sports, particularly in football. The annual East/West football game usually draws large crowds, is usually televised, and is alternately hosted by each school, except in 2017 when the game was held at Lakota West High School for two consecutive years. 

Several additions and renovations were made to Lakota East High School by Turner Construction during the 2007-2008 school year.

Athletics 
Lakota East's mascot is the Thunderhawk. The school colors are black, white and silver.  The school is classified as a Division I school in all sports under OHSAA standards and is a member of the Greater Miami Conference. The Lakota East Baseball team won the school's first state title in 2011 under head coach Ray Hamilton.

OHSAA State Championships
Girls Track and field - 2019
Boys Baseball - 2011

As Lakota High School:
Girls Volleyball - 1994
Boys Basketball - 1992
Girls Cross Country - 1984
Girls Cross Country - 1983

Extracurricular activities
The school's student-run, nationally accredited and award-winning news magazine, Spark, runs several issues throughout each school year.

Lakota East's Latin Club functions as a local chapter of both the Ohio Junior Classical League (OJCL) and National Junior Classical League (NJCL).

Lakota East has a group of musicians called the Singing Thunderhawks. Taught by Rebecca Huddilston, Lakota East sports an impressive six choirs: Women's Freshmen Choir, Women's Black Choir, Women's Silver Choir, Men's Choir, Eastside Voices and Eastside Music Company. They perform four concerts throughout the school year and frequently score high at Ohio Music Education Association (OMEA) competitions. Once every two years, they perform at Walt Disney World in Orlando, Florida, frequently placing.

The school has a thespian troupe, called Thunderhawk Theater, run by Kristen Hoch. They perform three shows each year: a children's show in the fall, a play in the winter, and a larger, musical production in the spring. They are members of the International Thespian Society, Troupe #4080.

Lakota East is the home of the FIRST Robotics Competition Team 1038, and have won several awards since their first in 2003.

Lakota East functions as a local chapter for the INTERalliance of Greater Cincinnati, which helps inspire and assist young talent to pursue careers in information technology in the Greater Cincinnati area.

Lakota East founded a Hack Club in 2017 and has participated in several information technology-related events, like the University of Cincinnati Information Technology Expo.

Lakota East, along with Lakota West, were one of the first schools in the Cincinnati Tri-State area to establish a Hope Squad, a peer-to-peer suicide prevention program. The Lakota Local School District partnered with Greater Cincinnati's Grant Us Hope to pilot the program to both high schools during the 2018-2019 school year.

Marching Thunderhawks
Lakota East High School is home to the Lakota East Marching Thunderhawks.

Lakota East has more than 40 Grand Champion titles from various OMEA competitions and has received a Superior rating at the OMEA State Marching Band Finals for 24 consecutive years.

Lakota East has participated in numerous Bands of America Regional and Super Regional Championships, and has participated twice in the Bands of America Grand National Championships. Most notably, the Marching Thunderhawks finished 10th place at the 2017 Bands of America Indianapolis Super Regional Championships, and have been Semi-Finalists in the 2018 and 2022 Bands of America Grand National Championships.

Notable alumni
Luke Null, comedian

References

External links
 School web site
 Lakota East web-site
 Lakota Robotics - FRC Team 1038

High schools in Butler County, Ohio
Public high schools in Ohio
1997 establishments in Ohio
Educational institutions established in 1997